Boredale Hause is a mountain pass between Place Fell and Angletarn Pikes in the east of the English Lake District. It links the Patterdale and Boredale valleys. There is a large confusion of paths on the hause, which is largely grassy.

See also
List of hill passes of the Lake District

References

Mountain passes of the Lake District